Chuan may refer to:

 Quan, a Chinese surname
 Chuanr, a food originating in Xinjiang
 Abbreviation for Sichuan

See also
Chuanqi (disambiguation)